Microctenonyx is a genus of dwarf spiders that was first described by Friedrich Dahl in 1886.

Species
 it contains four species:
Microctenonyx apuliae (Caporiacco, 1951) – Italy
Microctenonyx cavifrons (Caporiacco, 1935) – Karakorum
Microctenonyx evansae (Locket & Russell-Smith, 1980) – Nigeria
Microctenonyx subitaneus (O. Pickard-Cambridge, 1875) (type) – Europe, Macaronesia, North Africa to Kyrgyzstan. Introduced to USA, South Africa, Australia, New Zealand

See also
 List of Linyphiidae species (I–P)

References

Araneomorphae genera
Linyphiidae
Spiders of Africa
Spiders of Asia
Taxa named by Friedrich Dahl